Three referendums were held in Switzerland during 1895. The first was held on 3 February on a popular initiative on a federal law on Swiss embassies abroad, and was rejected by a majority of voters. The second was held on 29 September on a federal resolution on amending the constitution regarding the institution of a match monopoly, and was rejected by a majority of voters and cantons. The third was held on 3 November on a constitutional amendment regarding the military, and was also rejected by a majority of voters and cantons.

Background
The referendums on a match monopoly and the military were mandatory referendums, which required a double majority; a majority of the popular vote and majority of the cantons. The decision of each canton was based on the vote in that canton. Full cantons counted as one vote, whilst half cantons counted as half. The embassies referendum was an optional referendum, which required only a majority of the public vote.

Results

Embassies

Match monopoly

Constitutional amendment on the military

References

1895 referendums
1895 in Switzerland
Referendums in Switzerland